Yevgeny Rasskazov (born 21 October 1941) is a Soviet former sports shooter. He competed in the 50 metre pistol event at the 1964 Summer Olympics.

References

External links
 

1941 births
Living people
Soviet male sport shooters
Olympic shooters of the Soviet Union
Shooters at the 1964 Summer Olympics
People from Zadonsky District
Sportspeople from Lipetsk Oblast